Amber Tang (born 30 April 1995), is a Hong Kong hostess and actress. She was the first runner-up and Miss Photogenic in the Miss Hong Kong 2018 Pageant. She is currently a TVB Manager Contract Artist.

Early and personal life
Amber Tang graduated from Heep Yunn Primary School (2007) and Heep Yunn School (2013) and obtained 5** in 4 subjects in the Hong Kong Diploma of Secondary Education Examination before completing her Architecture degree at the School of Architecture at The University of Hong Kong. After graduating in 2017, she worked as an Architectural trainee, participating in the A&D Trophy Awards 2017 under the theme of "Vertical Courtyard", where she won the Merit Award in the Student Sector Architecture category.

In 2018, Tang participated in the 46th Miss Hong Kong Pageant where she was crowned first runner up as well as Miss Photogenic in the Miss Hong Kong 2018 Pageant. In mid-October 2018, Tang signed a contract with TVB to become a manager contract artist and enrolled in a two-month short-term TVB artist training course. In March of the following year, she and her brother Derek Tang launched the YouTube channel "WE ARE NOT TWINS", where they mainly upload short videos to share interesting stories about life, but then quit due to her acting work.

Controversy
In May 2019, Hong Kong media reported that Amber Tang suspected of having an affair with TVB male artist Arnold Kwok, and the two were accused of having an affair with each other at the beginning of the year during the filming the TVB show "Entertain Everyone", often meeting in the gym. In April, some netizens once witnessed Kwok taking advantage of his girlfriend's job in the United States to be with a woman suspected to be Amber Tang. Some netizens compared Tang's dress with some photos of Kwok and the woman traveling, inferring that the woman in the photo was Tang; in addition, the media also took photos of the two visiting a real estate together, showing that the two sides behaved intimately.  In response to the incident, Kwok claimed that the "breakup" did not involve a third party, even though his ex-girlfriend accused him through social platforms that "someone is lying" . In July 2020, Arnold Kwok publicly admitted to associating with Amber Tang.

Filmography

Television dramas

Television Host
 The Hong Kong Games (2019)
 Fluffie Sarena (2019)

References

External links
 

Living people
1995 births
21st-century Hong Kong actresses
Alumni of Hong Kong Baptist University
Hong Kong models
Hong Kong film actresses
Hong Kong television actresses